Športno društvo Rogoza or simply ŠD Rogoza is a Slovenian football club which plays in the town of Rogoza. Founded in 1963, they competes in the 1. MNZ Maribor League, the fourth tier of the Slovenian football system. The club play their home matches at the 500 capacity Rogoza Sports Park.

In the mid-2010s, ŠD Rogoza merged with NK Hoče to form NŠ Roho.

Honours
Slovenian Third League – North
Winners: 1998–99

References

External links
Official website 

Association football clubs established in 1963
Football clubs in Slovenia
1963 establishments in Slovenia